Mathilde Hignet (born 10 June 1993) is a French politician from La France Insoumise. She was elected as the member of parliament for Ille-et-Vilaine's 4th constituency in the 2022 French legislative election.

References

See also 

 List of deputies of the 16th National Assembly of France

1993 births
Living people
People from Rennes
21st-century French politicians
21st-century French women politicians
Women members of the National Assembly (France)
La France Insoumise politicians
Members of Parliament for Ille-et-Vilaine
Deputies of the 16th National Assembly of the French Fifth Republic